German submarine U-658 was a Type VIIC U-boat built for Nazi Germany's Kriegsmarine for service during World War II.
She was laid down on 15 November 1940 by Howaldtswerke, Hamburg as yard number 807, launched on 11 September 1941 and commissioned on 5 November 1941 under Kapitänleutnant Hans Senkel.

Design
German Type VIIC submarines were preceded by the shorter Type VIIB submarines. U-658 had a displacement of  when at the surface and  while submerged. She had two shafts and two  propellers.

U-658 was fitted with five  torpedo tubes (four fitted at the bow and one at the stern), fourteen torpedoes, one  SK C/35 naval gun, 220 rounds, and a  C/30 anti-aircraft gun. The boat had a complement of between forty-four and sixty.

Service history
The boat's career began with training at 8th U-boat Flotilla on 5 November 1941, followed by active service on 1 August 1942 as part of the 6th Flotilla for the remainder of her service.

Wolfpacks
U-658 took part in two wolfpacks, namely:
 Panther (13 – 20 October 1942)
 Veilchen (20 – 30 October 1942)

Fate
U-658 was sunk on 30 October 1942 in the North Atlantic east of Newfoundland, in position , by depth charges from RCAF Hudson bomber from 145 Squadron. There were no survivors.

Summary of raiding history

References

Bibliography

External links

German Type VIIC submarines
1941 ships
U-boats commissioned in 1942
Ships lost with all hands
U-boats sunk in 1943
U-boats sunk by depth charges
U-boats sunk by Canadian aircraft
World War II shipwrecks in the Atlantic Ocean
World War II submarines of Germany
Ships built in Hamburg
Maritime incidents in October 1942